Frank John Kaderabek (born 1929) is the former principal trumpet of the Philadelphia Orchestra (1975-1995) and former trumpet instructor of the Curtis Institute of Music in Philadelphia.

Career 
Born in Chicago, he studied with Edward Masacek and  Adolph Herseth and moved to New York to study with Harry Glantz and Nathan Prager. He was principal trumpet of the Dallas Symphony (1953-1958), assistant/third trumpet with the Chicago Symphony Orchestra (1958-1967) and principal with the Detroit Symphony Orchestra (1967-1975) before joining the Philadelphia Orchestra under chief conductor Eugene Ormandy. Many of his private students and students from Curtis now play in major orchestras. He is widely regarded as one of the world's finest trumpet players and teachers.

Kaderabek remains on the faculty at West Chester University, where he serves as an adjunct faculty member. While there, Kaderabek gives all of his students one-hour lessons every two weeks instead of half-hour lessons every week, saying, "You cannot accomplish anything worthwhile in only half an hour. By that time you have only just said 'hello'". Kaderabek did a clinic at the first annual West Chester University Trumpet Fest on the Fundamentals of Trumpet Playing and also participated in the Claude Gordon International Brass Workshops from 1984 until the final one in 1993.

References

Living people
1929 births
American trumpeters
American male trumpeters
Musicians from Chicago
West Chester University faculty
Curtis Institute of Music faculty
American music educators
21st-century trumpeters
21st-century American male musicians
Musicians of the Philadelphia Orchestra